This is a list of lighthouses in the People's Republic of China which includes mainland China and the two special administrative regions of Hong Kong and Macau.

Lighthouses in Mainland China

Lighthouses in Hong Kong

Following the establishment of British Hong Kong as a trade port in 1841, the first lighthouses in Hong Kong were planned and built to assist international navigation. The first lighthouse to enter service was Cape D'Aguilar Lighthouse in April 1875, which was operated by lighthouse keepers who received specialist training in London and lived in the lighthouse in one-month shifts.

As of 2017, five lighthouse structures in Hong Kong that date from before the Second World War remain in operation: Cape D'Aguilar, Green Island (two lighthouses), Waglan, and Tang Lung Chau. All of them are listed heritage sites. Lei Yue Mun Lighthouse has also been in continuous operation since 1902, but the structure was rebuilt in the 1950s. In addition, Gap Island Lighthouse (also known as Mosquito Island, or Man Mei Chau from Cantonese 蚊尾洲, pronounced Wenwei Zhou in Mandarin), situated on an island due south from Hong Kong, was built in 1892 in collaboration between the British Hong Kong and Qing Empire governments; this lighthouse is now under Guangdong administration and fully automated using solar power.

Lighthouses in Macau

See also
 Lists of lighthouses and lightvessels
 China Maritime Safety Administration

References

External links

 

China

Lighthouses
Lighthouses